Sadegh Mohammad-Karami (born March 21, 1984) is an Iranian footballer who plays for Moghavemat Sepasi F.C. in the IPL.

Club career
Mousavi has played his entire career with Moghavemat Sepasi

Club career statistics

 Assist Goals

References

1984 births
Living people
Fajr Sepasi players
Iranian footballers
Association football midfielders